Tommy Walker is an American worship leader, composer of contemporary worship music, recording artist and author. Since 1990, he has been the worship leader at Christian Assembly, a church affiliated with the International Church of the Foursquare Gospel in Los Angeles, California. Some of Walker's most well-known songs are "Only A God Like You," "No Greater Love," "Mourning Into Dancing," "He Knows My Name," and "That's Why We Praise Him."

In addition to his responsibilities as a church leader, he has taken the "CA Worship Band" on numerous overseas trips, including several trips to Southeast Asia and the Philippines.  He has worked alongside Franklin Graham, Greg Laurie, Jack Hayford, Bill Hybels, Rick Warren and at Promise Keepers events.

Career
In 2000, Walker released his album Never Gonna Stop, which earned a larger reception than his previous albums, peaking at number one hundred and fifty three on the Billboard Top 200 chart.  In 2004, Walker released his album, Make it Glorious, which was recorded live at Regent University with a 50-member choir. A choral collection of some of Walker's best-known songs entitled That's Why We Praise Him: Celebrating the Songs of Tommy Walker (arranged and orchestrated by Bradley Knight) was also released in 2004. This was followed by a second choral collection of songs by Walker, Great and Marvelous: Celebrating the Songs of Tommy Walker Volume 2, in 2005, which earned Walker a Dove Award nomination. On March 18, 2008, following eight live recordings and many years as a worship leader, Tommy Walker released his first studio recording, I Have A Hope. The album was produced by producer Ed Cash and labeled by Maranatha! Music. In support of his national studio debut, Walker made appearances at the National Christian Musicians Summit, Liberty University and the National Worship Leadership Conference, run by Worship Leader Magazine. In an interview, Walker said that he had been offered deals by record labels and publishers when his songs were first being recorded, but he had declined the offers because he had grown up with a negative perception on the music industry. In 2012, Shepherd University (Cornel School of Contemporary Music) awarded Tommy Walker with an “Honorary Doctorate in Music Arts”.

Musical style

Influences
Tommy Walker has cited Justo Almario, Abraham Laboriel, Andrae Crouch, Lindell Cooley and Darlene Zschech as influences.

A trained guitarist, Tommy is "Supported by Taylor Guitars".

Personal life
Tommy Walker is the son of Fred and Eileen Walker, who were once the pastors of an independent charismatic church. Walker's sister, Janey Stewart, and her husband, Sam Stewart, are the founders and overseers of Charlie's Lunch, a worldwide faith based relief organization. One of Walker’s brothers, Dale Walker is the founder and director of Heart of the World, an interdenominational, worldwide ministry, that operates Borderland Kids program, which is a program that provides food to needy children in the United States. Hilary (Walker) Overton, a niece of Tommy Walker, and her husband David, administrate Glory Reborn, a midwifery clinic in the Philippines. Tommy Walker is married to Robin Walker, and together, the couple has four children, Jake, Levi, Emmie and Eileen.

Discography
 Pray For Each Other - C.A. Worship Band (1991)
 We Say Yes - C.A. Worship Band (1992)
 Live Worship - Tommy Walker and the C.A. Worship Band (1994)
 Yes We All Agree - C.A. Worship Band (1996)
 C.A. Worship Band with Tommy Walker (1997)
 Night Prayer - Rique Pantoja/Tommy Walker (1997)
 Acoustic Hymns - C.A. Worship Band with Tommy Walker (1997)
 Live At Home - C.A. Worship Band with Tommy Walker (1999)
 Never Gonna Stop with Tommy Walker (2000)
 Only a God Like You (2000)
 Calling Out To You - C.A. Worship Band with Tommy Walker (2001)
 There Is a Rock - Tommy Walker and the C.A. Worship Band (2002)
 He Knows My Name - Songs 4 Worship - Surrender (2003)
 Make It Glorious - Tommy Walker (2004)
 Anthology [1991-2002] - C.A. Worship Band with Tommy Walker (2004)
 Heal Our Land: Live From Zambia - Tommy Walker and the C.A. Worship Band (2005)
 Break Through - Tommy Walker (2006)
 This is What Christmas Means to Me - Tommy Walker and the C.A. Worship Band (2007)
 I Have A Hope - Tommy Walker (2008)
 Overflow - Tommy Walker (2009)
 Overflow: Japan-Hawaii Version - Tommy Walker and PacRim Friends (2010)
 The Pursuit of God: Songs For A Thirsty Soul - Tommy Walker (2011)
 Generation Hymns Live with Tommy Walker (2012)
 Acoustic Hymns (2014 Re-Release) - Tommy Walker and the C.A. Worship Band (2014)
 Living In The Wonder - Tommy Walker (2014)
 Generation Hymns 2 - Tommy Walker with Sean Beck and the CBC Choir (2015)
 The Best of Song of the Week with Tommy Walker (2016)
 The Book of John in Song - Tommy Walker (2018)
 Song of the Week 2019 [Vol 1-3] - Tommy Walker (2019)
 Generation Carols - Tommy Walker (2019)
 Highest Praises - Tommy Walker and Eileen Walker (2021)
 Generation Hymns 3 - Tommy Walker (2022)

Singles
 I'm Going to Bethlehem (2008)
 He Knows My Name (2008)

Charts
Albums - Billboard (North America)

Bibliography
 Songs From Heaven. Regal Books, 2001,  (with Phil Kassel)
 52 Devotional Thoughts for Worship Leaders. Sundog, 2004, 
 He Knows My Name. Regal Books, 2004, 
 Breakthrough. Regal Books, 2006, —(with Marcus Brotherton)

Award Nominations
GMA Dove Awards

|-
| 2006|| Great and Marvelous-Celebrating the Songs of Tommy Walker Vol. 2  ||Choral Collection of the Year || 
|-

References

External links
Tommy Walker Ministries Official Website
Christian Assembly Official Website
[ Tommy Walker] at Allmusic

Living people
Promise Keepers
Songwriters from California
American performers of Christian music
Christian music songwriters
Performers of contemporary worship music
American male singers
Members of the Foursquare Church
Singers from California
Guitarists from California
American male guitarists
Year of birth missing (living people)
American male songwriters